Cambridgeshire is a county in England.

Cambridgeshire may also refer to:

Cambridgeshire (UK Parliament constituency), (1290–1885 and 1918–1983)
Cambridgeshire (European Parliament constituency) (1979–1984 and 1994–1999)
Cambridgeshire (historic), from the 10th century, an area in the eastern half of the present county
Cambridgeshire and Isle of Ely, a former administrative county 1965–1974
HMT Cambridgeshire (FY142), a British armed trawler
Cambridgeshire Handicap, a horse race run at Newmarket racecourse
The Cambridgeshire, a greyhound race run between 1936 and 1982

See also